Ahmed Touili (10 May 1942 – 12 January 2022) was a Tunisian academic.

Biography
A doctor in Arabic literature, Touili taught at the Hankuk University of Foreign Studies, Qatar University, and Norfolk State University. He became a professor at Tunis University and was the author of approximately one hundred books on Arabic and Islamic literature and civilization.

Touili died in Tunis on 12 January 2022, at the age of 79.

Publications
La littérature tunisienne à l'époque hafside (2004)
Voyage d'Orient et d'Occident (2004)
Personnalités tunisiennes (2004)
Mâlik ibn Anas et les imams de la sunna (2007)
L'histoire de la culture et de la civilisation kairouanaise (2009)
Faits notables à Kairouan (2009)
Histoire de Kairouan (2009)
Contrat de mariage kairouanais (2010)
L'éclat culturel de Tunis durant les périodes médiévale et moderne
Les lieux de culture à Tunis à l'époque hafside
La Tunisie, source d'inspiration des poètes
De la tolérance et de la réforme chez des intellectuels tunisiens (XIXe et XXe siècles)
Le mouvement réformiste en Tunisie
Le collège Sadiki : histoire d'une genèse
Lectures dans le patrimoine arabe et islamique
De Séoul à Singapour

References

1942 births
2022 deaths
Academic staff of Hankuk University of Foreign Studies
Islamic studies scholars
Historians of Arabic literature
Alumni of Sadiki College
Academic staff of Tunis University
Tunisian expatriates in Qatar
People from Kairouan
Academic staff of Qatar University
Norfolk State University faculty